Jacques Perrier (12 October 1924 – 23 June 2015) was a French basketball player. He was inducted into the French Basketball Hall of Fame, in 2006.

French national team
Perrier was the leading scorer of the EuroBasket 1947. He also played at the 1948 Summer Olympic Games. He was a part of the senior French national team that won the silver medal.

References

External links
Jacques Perrier on databaseOlympics.com
Jacques Perrier's obituary 

1924 births
2015 deaths
French men's basketball players
Olympic basketball players of France
Basketball players at the 1948 Summer Olympics
Olympic silver medalists for France
Olympic medalists in basketball
Knights of the Ordre national du Mérite
Medalists at the 1948 Summer Olympics
Shooting guards
1950 FIBA World Championship players